The 2006 Libyan SuperCup took place between 2005-06 Libyan Premier League champions Al Ittihad and 2005-06 Libyan Cup winners Al Ahly Tripoli. This was the 10th edition of the competition, and it resulted in Al Ittihad's 5th consecutive victory, after they won 1-0 over their arch rivals.

Match details

Libyan Super Cup
Super Cup